Johan Blackstad (16 November 1832 – 8 November 1904) was a Norwegian judge and politician for the Conservative Party.

He was born in Bergen and took the cand.jur. degree in 1857. He was hired in the Norwegian Ministry of Justice and the Police in 1860, and in 1870 he went on to become district stipendiary magistrate in Varanger. From 1874 to 1882 he served as County Governor of Finnmarkens Amt. While stationed here he was elected twice to the Norwegian Parliament from the constituency Hammerfest, Vardø og Vadsø. He left Parliament in 1885 during a very critical time for the Conservative Party.

In 1882 he became district stipendiary magistrate in Eker, Modum og Sigdal, and in 1889 he became presiding judge in Eidsivating Court of Appeal. In 1891 he was named acting Director of Public Prosecutions. He got the position on a permanent basis in 1901. He held this post until he died in November 1904, on the way to his office.

References

1832 births
1904 deaths
Civil servants from Bergen
Norwegian judges
County governors of Norway
Members of the Storting
Conservative Party (Norway) politicians
Finnmark politicians
Lawyers from Bergen